Karlo Muhar (born 17 January 1996) is a Croatian professional footballer who plays as a midfielder for Liga I side CFR Cluj.

Career

Lech Poznań 

On 5 June 2019, he signed a four-year contract with Polish side Lech Poznań. He made his debut in Lech on 20 July 2019 in a game against defending champion Piast Gliwice.

Kayserispor 

On 28 January 2021, he signed a 6-month contract with Turkish club Kayserispor.

CFR Cluj
On 8 June 2022, Muhar joined the defending Romanian Liga I champions CFR Cluj on a permanent basis.

Career statistics

Club

Honours
Dinamo Zagreb
1. HNL: 2017–18
Croatian Cup: 2017–18

CSKA Sofia
Bulgarian Cup runner-up: 2021–22

CFR Cluj
Supercupa României runner-up: 2022

References

External links

1996 births
Living people
Footballers from Zagreb
Association football midfielders
Croatian footballers
GNK Dinamo Zagreb II players
GNK Dinamo Zagreb players
NK Inter Zaprešić players
Lech Poznań players
Lech Poznań II players
Kayserispor footballers
PFC CSKA Sofia players
CFR Cluj players
Croatian Football League players
First Football League (Croatia) players
Ekstraklasa players
II liga players
Süper Lig players
First Professional Football League (Bulgaria) players
Croatian expatriate footballers
Expatriate footballers in Poland
Expatriate footballers in Turkey
Expatriate footballers in Bulgaria
Expatriate footballers in Romania
Croatian expatriate sportspeople in Poland
Croatian expatriate sportspeople in Turkey
Croatian expatriate sportspeople in Bulgaria
Croatian expatriate sportspeople in Romania